Gurap is a village in Dhaniakhali CD block in Chinsurah subdivision of Hooghly district in the state of West Bengal, India.

Geography

Location
The area is composed of flat alluvial plains that form a part of the Gangetic Delta.

Police station
Gurap police station has jurisdiction over a part of Dhaniakhali CD block.

Urbanisation
In Chandannagore subdivision 58.52% of the population is rural and the urban population is 41.48%. Chandannagore subdivision has 1 municipal corporation, 3 municipalities and 7 census towns. The single municipal corporation is Chandernagore Municipal Corporation. The municipalities are Tarakeswar Municipality, Bhadreswar Municipality and Champdany Municipality. Of the three CD Blocks in Chandannagore subdivision, Tarakeswar CD Block is wholly rural, Haripal CD Block is predominantly rural with just 1 census town, and Singur CD Block is slightly less rural with 6 census towns. Polba Dadpur and Dhaniakhali CD Blocks of Chinsurah subdivision (included in the map alongside) are wholly rural. The municipal areas are industrialised. All places marked in the map are linked in the larger full screen map.

Demographics
As per the 2011 Census of India, Gurap had a total population of 7,856 of which 3,880 (49%) were males and 3,976 (51%) were females. Population below 6 years was 748. The total number of literates in Gurap was 5,126 (72.12% of the population over 6 years).

Transport
Gurap railway station is situated on the Howrah-Bardhaman chord.

The Kolkata-Agra National Highway 19/Durgapur Expressway passes through Gurap.

Culture
David J. McCutchion mentions the Nandadulala temple (1751) at Gurap as a standard atchala temple with porch on triple archway having leafy swathes. He mentions the dol-mancha (18th century) near the Nandadulala temple as having rich terracotta.  There are porches on neo classical pillars later attached to the atchala.

The temple of Nandadulala at Gurap (at Sr No S-WB-63) is included in the List of State Protected Monuments in West Bengal by the Archaeological Survey of India.

References

Villages in Hooghly district